The rough-bellied day gecko (Cnemaspis tropidogaster) is a species of day geckos found in  the Western Ghats of India and Sri Lanka.
Its distribution in the southern Western Ghats is patchy and relatively uncommon. It is active during the day. It has a distinct head, elongated snout, and keeled ventral scales; Its dark-brown dorsal side has transverse arrangement of light and dark variegations. It is pale brown/cream on its underside with spiny tubercles on its sides. Males have two to four preanal and three to six femoral pores.

Live populations were rediscovered nearly after 120 years from Sri Lanka in 2016 from a low elevation (50–80 m asl.) of the wet zone of Sri Lanka.

Habitat and distribution
A relatively uncommon day active gecko from the midhills of the Central Province Knuckles Mountain Range and also from Sabaragamuwa Province and parts of the monsoon forests in the Eastern Province of Sri Lanka.

Ecology and diet
Diurnal and crepuscular species, often found in rocky substrates and low trunks of trees, and occasionally entering man-made structures, such as thatched huts and cowheads.

References

 Boulenger, G.A. 1885 Catalogue of the Lizards in the British Museum (Nat. Hist.) I. Geckonidae, Eublepharidae, Uroplatidae, Pygopodidae, Agamidae. London: 450 pp.
 Inger R F; Marx H; Koshy M 1984 An undescribed species of gekkonid lizard (Cnemaspis) from India with comments on the status of C. tropidogaster. Herpetologica 40 (2): 149-154
 Taylor, E.H. 1953 A review of the lizards of Ceylon. Univ. Kansas Sci. Bull., Lawrence, 35: 1525-1585
 Wermuth, H. 1965 Liste der rezenten Amphibien und Reptilien. Gekkonidae, Pygopodidae, Xantusiidae. Das Tierreich (80):1-246
 Das, I. 2008 A Photographic Guide to Snakes and Other Reptiles of India, page 88.

Cnemaspis
Reptiles described in 1885